John Alexander may refer to:

Arts and entertainment
John Alexander (actor) (1897–1982), American stage and film actor
John Alexander (director), British television director
John Alexander (painter) (1686 – c. 1733), Scottish historical painter and engraver
John Alexander (tenor) (1923–1990), opera star
John Marshall Alexander Jr., birthname of American singer Johnny Ace (1929–1954)
John White Alexander (1856–1915), American painter
John Alexander (artist) (born 1945), American artist

Politics
John Alexander (councillor) (born 1988), Scottish National Party politician from Dundee, Scotland
John Alexander (Ohio politician) (1777–1848), U.S. Representative from Ohio
John Alexander (MP) (1802–1885), Irish member of the UK Parliament (1853–1859) for Carlow Borough
John M. Alexander Jr. (born 1949), member of the North Carolina Senate
John G. Alexander (1893–1971), U.S. Representative from Minnesota
John Alexander (Australian politician) (born 1951), member of the Australian House of Representatives
John Alexander (New Zealand politician) (1876–1941), member of the New Zealand Legislative Council, 1934–1941
John Alexander (New South Wales colonial politician), member of the New South Wales Legislative Council
John D. Alexander (politician) (1903–?), Canadian politician

Military
John B. Alexander (born 1937), retired US Army colonel and leading advocate for the development of non-lethal weapons
John Alexander (captain) (1711–1763), one of the founders of Alexandria, Virginia
John Alexander (VC) (died 1857), Irish recipient of the Victoria Cross
John Hanks Alexander (1864–1894), African American officer in the US armed forces
John D. Alexander (admiral) (born 1959), U.S. Navy admiral

Religion
John Alexander (bishop) (1694–1776), Scottish Episcopal Bishop of Dunkeld
John Alexander (Presbyterian minister) (1686–1743), minister and patristic commentator
John Alexander (nonconformist minister) (1736–1765), scriptural commentator

Sports
John Alexander (American football) (1896–1986), professional American football
John Alexander (defensive end) (born 1955), American football player on the list of Miami Dolphins players
John Alexander (racing driver) (born 1954), American race car driver
John Alexander (tennis) (born 1951), Australian tennis player, commentator, and politician 
John Alexander (footballer, born 1955) (born 1955), English former footballer and Manchester United club secretary
John Alexander (footballer, born 1985) (born 1985), English football forward for Darlington and many non-league clubs

Others
John Henry Alexander (1812–1867), scientist and president of Georges Creek Coal & Iron Co.
John Alexander (chief clerk) (1830–1916), chief clerk to Bow Street Magistrates' Court, editor of The Police Gazette
John Amyas Alexander (1922–2010), archaeologist at St John's College, Cambridge
John Alexander (priest) (1833–1908), Dean of Ferns, 1899–1908
John Alexander (doctor) (died 1901), medical health officer

See also
Alexander John (disambiguation)